Ivanovka is a rural locality (a selo) in Beloozersky Selsoviet, Gafuriysky District, Bashkortostan, Russia. The population was 59 as of 2010. There are 2 streets.

Geography 
Ivanovka is located 31 km northwest of Krasnousolsky (the district's administrative centre) by road. Daryino is the nearest rural locality.

References 

Rural localities in Gafuriysky District